Dutch Reformed Church in the English Neighborhood (English Neighborhood Reformed Church of Ridgefield) is a historic church at 1040 Edgewater Avenue in Ridgefield, Bergen County, New Jersey, United States. The church was built in 1793 and added to the National Register of Historic Places on September 18, 1998.

Notable burials
Alexander Shaler

See also 
 National Register of Historic Places listings in Bergen County, New Jersey
 English Neighborhood

References

External links

 Google View of Dutch Reformed Church in the English Neighborhood

Churches in Bergen County, New Jersey
Federal architecture in New Jersey
Gothic Revival church buildings in New Jersey
National Register of Historic Places in Bergen County, New Jersey
Churches on the National Register of Historic Places in New Jersey
Reformed Church in America churches in New Jersey
Churches completed in 1793
Ridgefield, New Jersey
Dutch-American culture in New Jersey
New Jersey Register of Historic Places
18th-century churches in the United States
1793 establishments in New Jersey